Gnoma affinis is a species of beetle in the family Cerambycidae. It was described by Jean Baptiste Boisduval in 1835. It is known from Papua New Guinea.

References

Lamiini
Beetles described in 1835